The Fuyou Road Mosque, also known as the North Mosque, is a mosque in Huangpu District, Shanghai, China.

History
Prior to the construction of the mosque, Muslims from Nanjing rented two houses for prayer. In 1870, a group of 31 Muslims raised money and purchased 400 m2 of land and constructed the Fuyou Road Mosque during the 9th year of the Tongzhi Emperor's reign of the Qing dynasty. The mosque was then later renovated and expanded several times in 1897, 1905, 1936 and 1979.

Architecture

The mosque covers an area of 1,520 m2 located in a three-story building in a traditional Qing dynasty style. The building houses the prayer hall, audience hall, dean's room, libraries, conference halls, bathrooms and other facilities. There is a rectangular-shaped courtyard right after the entrance of the building. In the north of the yard stands the ablution room and in the south stands the prayer hall.

The Wangyue Pavilion is built on the rooftop. There are also many decorations inside the mosque with various types of pattern and pierced floor carvings painted in the roof beams.

Activities
The mosque used to be the political, religious and cultural center for Muslims in Shanghai. It was also the birthplace for Wu Ben Primary School, the first Islamic school in the modern history of Shanghai. However, the mosque currently serves as the service center for prayer and other Muslim activities in the city. It housed the home of the Shanghai Islamic Board of Directors, which was founded in 1909.

Transportation
The mosque is accessible within walking distance east of Yuyuan Garden Station of Shanghai Metro.

See also
 Islam in China
 List of mosques in China

References

19th-century mosques
1870 establishments in China
Mosques in Shanghai
Mosques completed in 1870